Miss Universe 1955, the 4th Miss Universe pageant, was held on 22 July 1955 at the Long Beach Municipal Auditorium in Long Beach, California, United States, with 33 female competitors. This was the first Miss Universe pageant to be aired on television and CBS became the official broadcaster for the next 47 pageants.

Results

Placements

Contestants 

  Alaska - Lorna McLeod
  – Hilda Isabel Gorrindo Sarli †
  - Nicole De Mayer
  - Emília Barreto Correia Lima †
  Canada - Cathy Diggles
  - Maureen Neliya Hingert
  - Rosa Merello Catalán
  - Clemencia Martínez de Montis
  - Gilda Marín
  - Leonor Carcache Rodríguez
  - Maribel Arrieta Gálvez  †
  - Margaret Rowe
  - Sirkku Talja
  - Claude Petit
  - Margit Nünke † 
  - Sonia Zoidou
  - María del Rosario Molina Chacón
  - Pastora Pagán Valenzuela
  - Ilana Carmel
  - Elena Fancera
  - Keiko Takahashi
  - Kim Mee-chong
  - Hanya Beydoun
  - Yolanda Mayen
  - Rosa Argentina Lacayo †
  - Solveig Borstad
  - Yvonne Berenguer de los Reyes
  - Carmen Laura Betancourt
  - Hillevi Rombin †
  - Inge Hoffmann
  - Carlene King Johnson † 
  - Carmen Susana Duijm †
  West Indies - Noreen Campbell

Notes

Debuts

Returns 
Last competed in 1953:

Withdrawals 

 
 
 
 
 
  Singapore

Did not compete 
  - Karin Pamella Rasmussen
  - Gladir Leopardi
  - Angelina Kalkhoven
  - Suna Soley

Awards 
  - Miss Friendship (Maribel Arrieta)
  - Most Popular Girl (Margaret Rowe)
  - The Best Dressed Girl (Rosa Argentina Lacayo)

General References

References 

1955
1955 beauty pageants
Beauty pageants in the United States
1955 in California
July 1955 events in the United States